Antona is a genus of moths.

Antona may also refer to

 Antona (name)
 USS Antona, disambiguation of two US Navy ships
 USS Antona (1863), formerly a British steamer of the same name
 USS Antona (IX-133), an unclassified vessel of the United States Navy

See also

 Altona (disambiguation)
 Annona (disambiguation)
 Anona (disambiguation)
 D'Antona (disambiguation)
 Antonia (disambiguation)